Edward Sadler (8 May 1910 – 26 December 1992) was an English dual-code international rugby union and rugby league footballer who played in the 1930s and 1940s. He played representative level rugby union (RU) for England, and whilst serving with the Royal Corps of Signals for the Army Rugby Union, and representative level rugby league (RL) for England, and at club level for Oldham (Heritage № 296) and Castleford (Heritage № 134). He also appeared for Wigan (Heritage № 459) as a World War II guest player.

Career

Rugby union
Born in Colchester, Essex, Sadler started his career playing rugby union in the Army. In 1933, he was selected to play for England, winning two caps.

Switch to rugby league
Later that year, Sadler joined rugby league side Oldham. He made his début, and scored his first try, against Broughton Rangers in August 1933. He scored six tries in 25 appearances for the club before joining Castleford in 1934. At that time, he was a "skilled bus driver".

Edward Sadler won a cap for England while at Oldham in the 13-63 defeat by Australia during the 1933–34 Kangaroo tour of Great Britain match at Stade Pershing, Paris on Sunday 31 December 1933, he also won a cap while at Castleford in 1939 against Wales.

County League appearances
Edward Sadler played in Castleford's victory in the Yorkshire County League during the 1938–39 season.

Challenge Cup Final appearances
Edward Sadler played  in Castleford's 11–8 victory over Huddersfield in the 1935 Challenge Cup Final during the 1934–35 season at Wembley Stadium, London on Saturday 4 May 1935, in front of a crowd of 39,000.

References

External links

Search for "Sadler" at rugbyleagueproject.org (as actual reference is misspelt as Saddler, and omits 1933 match against Australia)
Statistics at orl-heritagetrust.org.uk
Statistics at wigan.rlfans.com

1910 births
1992 deaths
Military personnel from Colchester
Army rugby union players
British Army personnel of World War II 
Castleford Tigers players
Dual-code rugby internationals
England international rugby union players
England national rugby league team players
English rugby league players
English rugby union players
Oldham R.L.F.C. players
Royal Corps of Signals soldiers
Rugby league locks
Rugby league players from Essex
Rugby league second-rows
Rugby union flankers
Rugby union players from Colchester
Wigan Warriors wartime guest players